Islam in Montenegro refers to adherents, communities and religious institutions of Islam in Montenegro. It is the second largest religion in the country, after Christianity. According to the 2011 census, Montenegro's 118,477 Muslims make up 20% of the total population. Montenegro's Muslims belong mostly to the Sunni branch. According to the estimate by the Pew Research Center, Muslims have a population of 130,000 (20.3%) as of 2020.

History

In the 15th century the Montenegrin ruler Ivan Crnojević (1465–1490) was at war with the infiltrating Venetians. Unable to maintain war on both fronts, the Ottoman Empire had conquered much of Montenegro's territory and introduced Islam. Ivan's third son Staniša Crnojević was the first prominent Montenegrin of the Muslim faith, and since then Islam was not an uncommon religion to the Crnojević Montenegrin ruling dynasty.

Staniša Crnojević took up the name Skenderbeg Crnojević and ruled from his capital at Cetinje. He is well known as one of the most prominent Muslim administrators in the northern reaches of the Ottoman Empire of Slavic origins during the reign of Sultan Selim I. Staniša Crnojević is known to have commanded an army of approximately 3000 Akıncı he also maintained correspondence with neighboring contemporaries such as Gazi Husrev-beg.

Twenty-first century
The Muslims of Montenegro are mostly Bosniaks and Albanians by ethnicity, but also some are declared as ethnic Muslims and Montenegrins. The adherents of Islam in Montenegro can be mostly found in the Sandžak region in Montenegro and Ulcinj, Bar and Podgorica. Bosniaks have similar ethnic background with ethnic Muslims, but differ in ideology of what ethnicity they belong to. In Montenegro are established 13 Councils of Islamic Community: Podgorica, Tuzi, Dinoša, Bar, Ulcinj, Pljevlja, Bijelo Polje, Berane, Petnjica, Rožaje, Plav and Gusinje.

Demographics

According to the 2011 census, there are 118,477 adherents of Islam in Montenegro. 

Ethnic composition of Muslims (adherents of Islam) in Montenegro:
 53,453 Bosniaks
 22,267 Albanians
 20,270 Muslims (distinctive ethnic group)
 12,758 Montenegrins
 5,034 Roma
 2,003 Egyptians (distinctive ethnic group)
 256 Muslims/Montenigrins
 195 Gorani
 183 Muslims/Bosniaks 
 181 Bosniaks/Muslims 
 172 Montenigrins/Muslims
 169 Bosnians
 101 Turks
 others (under 100 members per community) and ethnically undeclared

Geographical distribution
There are large regional differences in the distribution Muslim population. Rožaje Municipality, for example, is almost exclusively inhabited by adherents of Islam, while there are no Muslims living in Plužine Municipality.

Gallery

See also
 Religion in Montenegro
 Islamic Community of Montenegro

References

Further reading
 
 
 

 
Montenegro